John Frederick Noack (born 16 May 1944) is a former Australian rules footballer who played for Geelong in the Victorian Football League (now known as the Australian Football League).

Noack is of Wendish descent and was one of the founders of the Wendish Heritage Society of Australia.

Noack attended Concordia College in Adelaide and went on to study history, philosophy and languages at Adelaide University. Although he intended to be a history and geography teacher, his father influenced him into the ministry and he completed the Lutheran Seminary course in 1968. During his religious studies he played football for Sturt in Adelaide and one game for Geelong when he lived there in 1967 as a trainee vicar.

References

External links
 
 

1944 births
Living people
Geelong Football Club players
Sturt Football Club players
Australian rules footballers from South Australia